The 1980 Baltimore Colts season was the 28th season for the team in the National Football League (NFL). The Colts finished the NFL's 1980 season with a record of 7 wins and 9 losses, and fourth position in the AFC East division.

Offseason

NFL draft

Personnel

Staff

Roster

Regular season

Schedule

Game summaries

Week 1

Week 2

Week 3

Week 4

Week 5

Week 6 at Bills

Standings

See also 
 History of the Indianapolis Colts
 Indianapolis Colts seasons
 Colts–Patriots rivalry

References 

Baltimore Colts
1980
Baltimore